The Iran women's national football team (recognized as IR Iran by FIFA) represents Iran in international women's football around the world, and is controlled by the Football Federation Islamic Republic of Iran (FFIRI). The FFIRI official in charge of women's football is Seyyedeh Shohreh Mousavi.

History
The first Iranian women's national team was established by Taj Tehran Football Club. The Iranian women's national team has a long history, with a women's Perspolis FC team dating back to 1976.
Refounded in 2005, the team reached second place at the 2005 West Asian Football Federation Women's Championship in Amman, Jordan held in September and October 2005.

In May 2006, the women's team hosted their first foreign visitors when a club from Berlin, Germany called BSV Al-Dersimspor played out a 2–2 draw in Ararat Stadium, Tehran.

The team won second place again at the 2007 and 2011 West Asian Football Federation Women's Championship.

Iran were briefly banned by FIFA from international competition in 2011 for wearing hijabs. This caused Iran to forfeit its bid to qualify for the 2012 Summer Olympics. The ban was lifted in 2012.

In 2015 there were reports that eight players on the team were males awaiting sex change operations.

Iran qualified for their first ever AFC Women's Asian Cup when they won against Jordan on penalties in the qualifiers for the 2022 edition to be hosted in India. In Iran's historic debut, Iran impressed by holding India goalless, but following India's withdrawal due to COVID-19 pandemic, Iran's only point was lost, and thus Iran was left vulnerable to China and Chinese Taipei, losing 0–7 and 0–5 in process and was eliminated as the worst third-placed team.

Team image

Nicknames
The Iran women's national football team have been known or nicknamed as the "Team Melli Baanovaan (The Ladies National Team)".

Kits and crest

Kit suppliers
The table below shows the history of kit supplier for the Iranian national football team.

Home stadium
Iran plays their home matches on the Ararat Stadium.

Attendance of women in football matches

On 9 November 2018 Fatma Samoura, Secretary General of International Federation of Football Association FIFA said she would ask Iranian government to end ban on women’s entry to sport stadiums.

In September 2019 it was reported that Iranian female football star Sahar Khodayari, dubbed the "blue girl", died after self-immolating in front of a court in Tehran when she found out she could face a two year sentence for attempting to enter a football stadium to watch her team play.

Results and fixtures

The following is a list of matches in the last 12 months, as well as any future matches that have been scheduled.

Legend

2022

2023

 Iran Fixtures and Results – SoccerWay.com

Head-to-head record
, after the match against .

Coaching staff

Current coaching staff

Manager history

 Shahrzad Mozafar (2005-2010)
 Maryam Irandoost (2010–2012)
 Helena Costa (2012–2014)
 Mahnaz Amirshaghaghi (2014–2016)
 Maryam Azmoon (2016–2020)
 Maryam Irandoost (2021–2022)
 Maryam Azmoon (2022–present)

Players

Current squad
The following 22 players were called up for the 2022 AFC Women's Asian Cup on 12 January 2022.

Information correct as of 12 January 2022.

Recent call-ups
The following players have been called up to the squad in the past 12 months.

Captains

 Zahra Ghanbari (20xx–present)

Records

*Active players in bold, statistics as of 1 August 2021.

Most appearances

Top goalscorers

Honours

Regional
 WAFF Women's Championship
  Runners-up: 2005, 2007, 2011

 CAFA Women's Championship
  Runners-up: 2018, 2022

Competitive record

FIFA Women's World Cup

*Draws include knockout matches decided on penalty kicks.

Olympic Games

AFC Women's Asian Cup

*Draws include knockout matches decided on penalty kicks.

Asian Games

WAFF Women's Championship

Malavan F.C. participated at the 2010.

CAFA Women's Championship

Iran U-23 team participated at the 2018.

FIFA World Ranking
, after the match against .

 Best Ranking   Best Mover   Worst Ranking   Worst Mover

See also
 Sport in Iran
 Football in Iran
 Women's football in Iran
 Football Federation Islamic Republic of Iran (IFF)
 Iran women's national football team
 Iran women's national football team results
 List of Iran women's international footballers
 Iran women's national under-20 football team
 Iran women's national under-17 football team
 Iran women's national futsal team
 Iran men's national football team

References

External links
 Iran women's national football team – official website 
 FIFA profile
 Iran Women's National Football Team

 
Asian women's national association football teams
National